The black-edged dichomeris or black-edged carbatina (Dichomeris heriguronis) is a moth of the family Gelechiidae. It is found in the north-eastern United States, Korea, Japan, China, Taiwan and India. It has also been recorded in the Netherlands, where it is an exotic species.

The length of the forewings is 7.5-8.5 mm.

The larvae feed on Prunus species in Korea.

References

heriguronis
Moths of Asia
Moths described in 1931